Julian John Somerset Hope, 2nd Baron Glendevon (6 March 1950 – 29 September 2009) was a British opera producer and nobleman.

Biography
Julian Hope was the elder son of Lord John Hope, later 1st Baron Glendevon and his wife, the former Mary Elizabeth Maugham, who was previously married to Vincent Paravicini and was the only child of novelist W. Somerset Maugham by his then mistress and later wife, Syrie Wellcome, daughter of the founder of Barnardo's. His godfather was Anthony Eden (1897-1977) and his godmother was Mrs. Paul Mellon (1910-2014). He had one sibling, Jonathan, and two half-siblings, Camilla and Nicholas Paravicini. The latter's son is Derek Paravicini, the blind autistic savant and musical prodigy.

He succeeded to his father's title in 1996.

Lord Glendevon was educated at Eton College and Christ Church, Oxford. He was resident producer at Welsh National Opera 1973-79 and associate producer at Glyndebourne Festival Opera 1974–81. His work was also seen at the Wexford Festival, San Francisco Opera, Dallas Opera and Paris.

He also worked in film and television, supervising the musical scores for Princess Caraboo and Onegin.

He never married, and on his death his title passed to his younger brother, Jonathan Hope.

References

Sources

Debrett's People of Today (12th edn, London: Debrett's Peerage, 1999), p. 742
Reports: Cardiff, The Musical Times, vol. 117, no. 1600 (June 1976) (Julian Hope's Welsh National Opera production of Il Trovatore)
Reports: The Musical Times, vol. 116, no. 1590 (August 1975) (Julian Hope's production of Georg Philipp Telemann's opera Pimpinone at Caerphilly Castle)
Julian Hope's IMDB record

External links
 Lord Glendevon - Daily Telegraph obituary

1950 births
2009 deaths
Barons in the Peerage of the United Kingdom
Alumni of Christ Church, Oxford
People educated at Eton College
Julian
Glendevon